Breil-sur-Roya (literally Breil on Roya;  or simply Breglio;) is a commune in the Alpes-Maritimes department in southeastern France.

Population

Geography

Breil-sur-Roya as its name says is located on the scenic and fast moving river Roya within the river's gorge and along the adjacent escarpments. The area features river rafting, swimming, and hiking.

Breil-sur-Roya is one of the towns on the route of the SNCF Train des Merveilles which runs between Nice and Cuneo in Italy. Trains operate seven times each direction as of 2020 can be taken from Nice (1 + 1/2 hour) for area touring. The line operated by Italy (FS, the Italian State Railroad) from Ventimiglia joints the SNCF line from Nice at Breil-sur-Roya.

Tourism
The GR52, part of the French Grande Randonnée walking trail network links the town to Gorges de Saorge and Vallon de Zouayne.

Breil-sur-Roya is particularly known for trout fishing. The Roya river runs through town and is open to trout anglers from March to September. Part of the trout run is reserved for fly-fishing. Trout anglers share the river with rafters, another popular local sport.

Flood of 2020

The river Roya violently flooded in October 2020. Major damage occurred to both commercial buildings, to residential homes, and to roads all the way downstream to Ventmiglia, Italy, on the seacoast.

Twin towns — sister cities
Breil-sur-Roya is twinned with:

  Borgo San Dalmazzo, Italy (2000)
  Aléria, France (2013)

See also
Communes of the Alpes-Maritimes department

References

Communes of Alpes-Maritimes
Alpes-Maritimes communes articles needing translation from French Wikipedia